This is a list of municipalities (urban or rural communes), and arrondissements of Morocco, based on the 2004 census.

In 2009 a new administrative division of Morocco was adopted, creating 13 new provinces: Berrechid, Driouch, Fquih Ben Salah, Guercif, Midelt, Ouezzane, Rehamna, Sidi Bennour, Sidi Ifni, Sidi Slimane, Tarfaya, Tinghir and Youssoufia. Many municipalities and communes below are now part of these new provinces. The list below is not yet updated for this change.

Sources

Recensement General de la Population et de l'Habitat de 2004. Royaume du Maroc Haut Commissariot au Plan (2004).  Accessed April 22, 2012.

 
 
 
 
Municipalities, Morocco
Subdivisions of Morocco